Valeriu Rudic (born 18 February 1947, in Talmaza) is a Moldovan microbiologist, chemist, biochemist and pharmacist who was selected member of Academy of Sciences of Moldova.

External links
http://www.asm.md/?go=detalii-membri&n=62&new_language=0

1947 births
Living people
Moldovan pharmacists
Titular members of the Academy of Sciences of Moldova
Recipients of the Order of Honour (Moldova)
Moldovan chemists
Biochemists